The original video animations (OVAs) series Saint Seiya: The Lost Canvas is based on the manga series with the same name authored by Shiori Teshirogi. It premièred in Japan on June 24, 2009. The production is by TMS Entertainment while Osamu Nabeshima is the series director and Yoshiyuki Suga the chief writer. Set in the 18th century, 243 years before the events of Masami Kurumada's Saint Seiya manga, The Lost Canvas focuses on how an orphan named Tenma becomes one of Athena's 88 warriors known as saints and finds himself in a war fighting against his best friend Alone who is revealed to be the reincarnation of Athena's biggest enemy, the god of the underworld, Hades.

The first season comprises thirteen OVAs, each 30 minutes in length. All the OVA episodes were released on DVD and Blu-ray format by VAP. Season 1 ended on April 21 with the release of the eleventh, twelfth and thirteenth episodes. The second season premièred on February 23, 2011, adding thirteen more OVAs to the series season 2 ended on July 20 with the release of OVAs 24, 25, and 26. In January 2011, Crunchyroll announced they would stream the series on the United States, Canada, the United Kingdom, and Ireland. In August 2018, it was revealed that VSI Los Angeles had been commissioned by Netflix to make an English dub to the series.

The original design was unveiled at the Tokyo International Anime Fair 2009. The remaining tracks were developed by Kaoru Wada.

It was confirmed in May 2013 via its Twitter official account, that TMS has currently no plans to produce a third season for The Lost Canvas anime adaptation.

Episode list

Season 1 (2009–2010)

Season 2 (2011)

References

External links
Official OVAs website 
Official OVAs News Blog  

Lost Canvas